Tawanna Dillahunt is an American computer scientist and information scientist based at the University of Michigan School of Information. She runs the Social Innovations Group, a research group that designs, builds, and enhances technologies to solve real-world problems. Her research has been cited over 2,700 times according to Google Scholar.

Education 
Tawanna Dillahunt was born in North Carolina and received her B.S. in Computer Engineering Magna  at North Carolina State University in 2000. She received her MS from the Oregon Graduate Institute of Science and Technology in 2005. She received an MS from Carnegie Mellon University in 2011 and her PhD from there in 2012. She joined the School of Information faculty at the University of Michigan in 2013.

Career and research
Dillahunt has worked in the areas of human-computer interaction, pervasive and ubiquitous computing, and computer supported collaborative work and social computing. She has received  the Inaugural Skip Ellis Early Career Award from the Computing Research Association. She is the recipient of   he Fran Allen IBM PhD Fellowship, the Richard Tapia Scholarship, and the IBM PhD Fellowship. She is a Kavli Fellow with the National Academy of Sciences.

She is best known for her work designing and evaluating technologies related to unemployment, environmental sustainability, and technical literacy. She has received multiple grants from the National Science Foundation to support her work. Most recently, she received a grant to study transportation barriers in underserved urban and rural communities in Michigan.  She has created numerous technology tools that lead to strategies to better recruit marginalize populations to career opportunities. Additionally, she is a faculty affiliate of the Science, Technology, and Public Policy (STPP) program at the University of Michigan Gerald R. Ford School of Public Policy.

Selected works
 Froehlich, J., Dillahunt, T., Klasnja, P., Mankoff, J., Consolvo, S., Harrison, B., & Landay, J. A. (2009, April). UbiGreen: investigating a mobile tool for tracking and supporting green transportation habits. In Proceedings of the sigchi conference on human factors in computing systems (pp. 1043–1052). (Cited 726 times, according to Google Scholar. )  
 Dillahunt, T. R., & Malone, A. R. (2015, April). The promise of the sharing economy among disadvantaged communities. In Proceedings of the 33rd Annual ACM Conference on Human Factors in Computing Systems (pp. 2285–2294). (Cited 335 times, according to Google Scholar  ) 
 Dillahunt, T. R. (2014, April). Fostering social capital in economically distressed communities. In Proceedings of the SIGCHI Conference on Human Factors in Computing Systems (pp. 531–540).
 Dillahunt, T., Wang, Z., & Teasley, S. D. (2014). Democratizing higher education: Exploring MOOC use among those who cannot afford a formal education. International Review of Research in Open and Distributed Learning, 15(5), 177–196.

References

Living people
American computer scientists
American women computer scientists
Carnegie Mellon University alumni
African-American scientists
21st-century American scientists
21st-century American women scientists
University of Michigan faculty
Women computer scientists
Computer scientists
Year of birth missing (living people)